Jean-Baptiste-François d'Oultremont (28 April 1672 – 8 May 1735), seigneur de Lamine, was grand-bailiff of Moha and mayor of Liège in 1711.

Life
His mother was Marie-Jacqueline de Berlaymont, dame de Thiribu. He died without issue at his younger brother's residence of the château de Warfusée.

References

Bibliography
 Baron Isidore de Stein d'Altenstein, Annuaire de la noblesse de Belgique, 1861, page 242.
 Le Siècle des Lumières dans la Principauté de Liège : [exposition], Musée de l’art wallon et de l’évolution culturelle de la Wallonie, octobre-novembre-décembre 1980, Liège, [Le Musée, 1980], p. 183.
 Généalogie succincte de la Maison d'Oultremont, extrait de l'historien Maurice Yans, pp.70 et 71, 1990, Warfusée, Saint-Georges D/CEO/Editeur

1735 deaths
1672 births
History of Liège